USS Douglas County (LST-731) was an  built for the United States Navy during World War II. Named after counties in 12 states, she was the only U.S. Naval vessel to bear the name.

LST-731 was laid down on 27 December 1943 at Pittsburgh, Pennsylvania, by the Dravo Corporation of Neville Island; launched on 12 February 1944; sponsored by Mrs. A. J. Ackerman; and commissioned on 30 March 1944.

Service history
During World War II, LST-731 was assigned to the Asiatic-Pacific theater and participated in the following operations: capture and occupation of Guam (July and August, 1944), and assault and occupation of Iwo Jima (February and March, 1945). Following the war, LST-731 was redesignated hospital ship LSTH-731 on 15 September 1945 and performed occupation duty in the Far East until mid-February, 1946. She was decommissioned on 2 June 1950 and redesignated LST-731 on 6 March 1952. The ship received the name USS Douglas County (LST-731) on 1 July 1955 and was struck from the Naval Vessel Register on 1 November 1958. Her final fate is unknown.
 
LST-731 earned two battle stars for World War II service.

References

See also
 List of United States Navy LSTs
 LSTH

LST-542-class tank landing ships
World War II amphibious warfare vessels of the United States
Cold War amphibious warfare vessels of the United States
Ships built in Pittsburgh
Douglas County, Colorado
Douglas County, Georgia
Douglas County, Illinois
Douglas County, Kansas
Douglas County, Minnesota
Douglas County, Missouri
Douglas County, Nebraska
Douglas County, Nevada
Douglas County, Oregon
Douglas County, South Dakota
Douglas County, Washington
Douglas County, Wisconsin
1944 ships
Hospital ships of the United States Navy
Ships built by Dravo Corporation